Jonathan Watson (1760–1808) was an Anglican clergyman who served in the Scottish Episcopal Church as the Bishop of Dunkeld from 1792 to 1808.

Life

He was born in January 1760 and undoubtly a native of Portsoy, Banffshire. Watson was trained for Holy Orders in the Scottish Episcopal Church by John Skinner, Incumbent of Longside (later Bishop of Aberdeen and Primus). He was ordained at the early age of twenty-one or twenty-two (1771 or 1772). His first known pastoral appointment was the Incumbent of Blairdaff (Monymusk) and Auchindoir (1781–1786), followed by the Incumbent of Banff and Portsoy (1786–1791), and then the Incumbent of Laurencekirk (1791–1808); the last appointment he held until his death.

Watson was elected Bishop of Dunkeld in 1792 and consecrated at Stonehaven on 20 September 1792 by John Skinner, Primus of the Scottish Episcopal Church, Andrew Macfarlane, Bishop of Moray and Ross, and John Strachan, Bishop of Brechin.

He died in office at Laurencekirk on 28 June 1808, aged 48, and was buried at St Laurence's Episcopal Churchyard, Laurencekirk on 5 July 1808.

Family

He married Catherine Margaret Edgar (1763–1845), daughter of John Edgar, Laird of Keithock, near Brechin, and they had two children: Catherine Mary (12 October 1802 – 8 January 1884) and John (born 1805 – died 1840 at sea).

References

Bibliography

 
 
  
 

 
 
 
 
 

1760 births
1808 deaths
Bishops of Dunkeld (Episcopal Church of Scotland)
18th-century Scottish Episcopalian bishops
19th-century Scottish Episcopalian bishops